Lorraine P. Segato  (born June 17, 1956 in Hamilton, Ontario) is a Canadian pop singer-songwriter, best known as the lead vocalist for and a principal songwriter of new wave and pop rock group The Parachute Club, with which she continues to perform.

History 

Segato initially became known in the late 1970s as the vocalist in the Toronto rock band Mama Quilla II. This band formed the core membership of The Parachute Club. The Parachute Club was particularly active in the 1980s, initially breaking up in 1989. Segato co-wrote nearly every song the band released, including all their singles.  A reconstituted version of the band, including Segato, commenced performing in 2005 and continued to perform somewhat sporadically through 2014. After the initial breakup of Parachute Club, Segato released a solo album, Phoenix, in 1990.

In 1990 she collaborated on the one-off single "Can't Repress the Cause", a plea for greater inclusion of hip hop music in the Canadian music scene, with Dance Appeal, a supergroup of Toronto-area musicians that included Devon, Maestro Fresh Wes, Dream Warriors, B-Kool, Michie Mee, Lillian Allen, Eria Fachin, HDV, Dionne, Thando Hyman, Carla Marshall, Messenjah, Jillian Mendez, Lorraine Scott, Self Defense, Leroy Sibbles, Zama and Thyron Lee White.

Her second solo album, Luminous City, followed in 1998.

She has also worked in film production, writing and directing a documentary on Toronto's late 1970s/early 1980s Queen Street West scene, Queen Street West, The Rebel Zone, and appearing in the documentary film The Pinco Triangle, and as a lecturer and social justice activist. Segato also appeared on the science fiction show Lexx, singing a song as the "Time Prophet" on the episode "Brigadoom".

She performed "Rise Up" at the state funeral of Jack Layton on August 27, 2011, supported by the choir of the Metropolitan Community Church of Toronto. In 2014, the surviving band members released a contemporary dance remix of the song in conjunction with Toronto's hosting of the 2014 edition of WorldPride.

Her third solo album, Invincible Decency, was released in 2015. She is also preparing Get Off My Dress, a loosely autobiographical one-woman theatrical play.

Segati was one of the people named to the Order of Canada on December 29, 2022, citing "her contributions to the Canadian music scene and culture as a pioneer in 2SLGBTQI+ Canadian history."

Personal life

An out lesbian, Segato married Ilana Landsberg-Lewis, the daughter of journalist Michele Landsberg and politician and diplomat Stephen Lewis and the sister of journalist Avi Lewis, in 2009. They have since separated.

Discography 

All songs co-written by Lorraine Segato

Singles (Parachute Club)

Albums

With Mama Quilla II

1982 – KKK//Mama Quilla/Angry Young Woman Tupperwaros; EP.

With The Parachute Club
1983 – The Parachute Club Current/RCA
1984 – At the Feet of the Moon Current/RCA
1985 – Moving Thru the Moonlight Current/RCA; remixes
1986 – Small Victories (1986) Current/RCA
1992 – Wild Zone: The Essential Parachute Club BMG; reissued 2006 by EMI International

Solo

1990 – Phoenix Warner Bros. Records
1998 – Luminous City True North
2015 – Invincible Decency

References

External links
Lorraine Segato's Official website
Lorraine Segato Website; not updated since 2004
Parachute Club Website/Blog

1956 births
21st-century Canadian dramatists and playwrights
Canadian new wave musicians
Canadian women singer-songwriters
Canadian people of Italian descent
Canadian women dramatists and playwrights
Feminist musicians
Women new wave singers
Canadian LGBT dramatists and playwrights
Canadian LGBT singers
Canadian LGBT songwriters
Canadian lesbian musicians
Canadian lesbian writers
Living people
Musicians from Hamilton, Ontario
Writers from Hamilton, Ontario
Musicians from Toronto
Writers from Toronto
Canadian documentary film directors
Canadian women film directors
21st-century Canadian women writers
Canadian women pop singers
The Parachute Club members
20th-century Canadian women singers
21st-century Canadian women singers
20th-century Canadian LGBT people
21st-century Canadian LGBT people
Canadian women documentary filmmakers
Members of the Order of Canada
Lesbian singers
Lesbian songwriters
Lesbian dramatists and playwrights